The Kandahar Sophytos Inscription is an inscription in Greek made by Sophytos, son of Naratos, in the 2nd century BCE, in the city of Kandahar. The inscription is written on a square limestone plaque, which was probably part of a wall. The inscription, although bought on a market, is thought to have come from Old Kandahar, the supposed ancient Alexandria in Arachosia.

The text is written in a very high level Greek language, displaying a real refinement of Greek culture so far east in Kandahar. The verses are in the sophisticated acrostich form.

Sophytos and Naratos are not Greek names. They may have been Iranian, their actual names being possibly Subhūti and Nārada. The name "Sophytos" is also known from a 4th-3rd century Greek coins of the Arachosian satrap Sophytos, who is otherwise unknown. There is a possibility that the Sophytos of the inscription may have been a descendant of the eponymous Satrap Sophytos.

According to the inscription, Sophytos was ruined in early life, but later rebuilt his fortune through fortitude. Some authors consider that his ruin may be due to the invasion of Arachosia by the Greco-Bactrians in the 2nd century BCE, supposing that Sophytos had been a Hellenized Iranian in the service of the Arachosians region of the Maurya Empire. The usage of Greek and Aramaic is attested in the area from the 3rd century BCE due to the Kandahar Bilingual Rock Inscription of Emperor Ashoka.

The inscription highlight the facts that some Iranian lived in the "Greek" city of Alexandria Arachosia, and had reached a very high level of Greek culture (only one mistake in prosody has been identified in the whole text).

Greek transliteration
Σωφύτου στήλη
Δ Δηρὸν ἐμῶγ κοκυῶν ἐριθηλέα δώματ᾽ ἐόντα
Ι ἲς ἄμαχος Μοιρῶν ἐξόλεσεν τριάδος·
Α αὐτὰρ ἐγὼ, τυννὸς κομιδῆι βιότοιό τε πατρῶν
Σ Σώφυτος εὖνις ἐὼν οἰκτρὰ Ναρατιάδης,
Ω ὡς ἀρετὴν Ἑκάτου Μουσέων τ᾽ ἤσχηκα σὺν ἐσθλῆι
Φ φυρτὴν σωφροσύνηι, θήμος ἐπεφρασάμην
Υ ὑψώσαιμί κε πῶς μέγαρον πατρώϊον αὔθις·
Τ τεκνοφόρον δὲ λαβὼν ἄλλοθεν ἀργύριον,
Ο οἴκοθεν ἐξέμολον μεμαὼς οὐ πρόσθ᾽ ἐπανελθεῖν
Υ ὕψιστον κτᾶσθαι πρὶμ μ᾽ άγαθῶν ἄφενος·
Τ τοὔνεκ᾽ ἐπ᾽ ἐμπορίηισιν ἰῶν εἰς ἄστεα πολλὰ
Ο ὄλβον ἀλωβήτος εὐρὺν ἐληισάμην
Υ ὑμνητὸς δὲ πέλων πάτρην ἐτέεσσιν ἐσῖγμαι
Ν νηρίθμοις τερπνός τ᾽ εὐμενέταις ἐφάνην·
Α ἀμφοτέρους δ᾽ οἶκόν τε σεσηπότα πάτριον εἶθαρ
Ρ ῥέξας ἐκ καινῆς κρέσσονα συντέλεσα
Α αἶάν τ᾽ ἔς τύμβου πεπτωκότος ἄλλον ἔτευξα,
Τ τὴν καὶ ζῶν στήλην ἐν ὁδῶι ἐπέθηκα λάλον.
Ο οὕτως οὖν ζηλωτὰ τάδ᾽ ἔργματα συντελέσαντος
Υ υἱέες υἱωνοί τ᾽ οἶκον ἔχοιεν ἐμοὖ.

Nota: As often on Hellenistic inscriptions, the sigma Σ has been replaced by the lunate sigma C.

English translation

The left vertical line, formed by repeating the first letter of each sentence (acrostich) reads ΔΙΑ ΣΩΦΥΤΟΥ ΤΟΥΝΑΡΑΤΟΥ "By Sophitos, son of Naratos"

References

Kandahar
Archaeological discoveries in Afghanistan
Greek inscriptions